Enidae is a family of air-breathing land snails, terrestrial pulmonate gastropod mollusks.

Anatomy 
In this family, the number of haploid chromosomes lies between 21 and 25 (according to the values in this table).

Taxonomy

1998 taxonomy 
The following subfamilies of Enidae are based on work by Schileyko (1998) and they are in use mainly by Russian malacologists:
 subfamily Pseudonapaeinae
 subfamily Chondrulopsininae
 subfamily Merdigerinae
 subfamily Buliminusinae
 subfamily Andronakiinae
 subfamily Retowskiinae
 subfamily Eninae - including Chondrula
 subfamily Multidentulini

2005 taxonomy 
The following two subfamilies have been recognized in the taxonomy of Bouchet & Rocroi (2005):
 subfamily Eninae B. B. Woodward, 1903 (1880)
 tribus Enini B. B. Woodward, 1903 (1880) - synonyms: Napaeinae A. J. Wagner, 1928; Jaminiinae Thiele, 1931; Pseudonapaeinae Schileyko, 1978; Retowskiinae Schileyko, 1978; Andronakiinae Schileyko, 1998
 tribus Chondrulini Wenz, 1923
 tribus Multidentulini Schileyko, 1978 - synonyms: Chondrulopsininae Schileyko, 1978; Merdigerinae Schileyko, 1984; Euchondrinae Schileyko, 1998
 subfamily Buliminusinae Kobelt, 1880 - synonym Buliminidae Pfeiffer, 1879

Genera
Genera within the family Enidae include:

subfamilia Eninae

 Boninena Habe, 1956

either in Enini or in Chondrulini
 Brephulopsis Lindholm, 1925
 Caucasicola Hesse, 1917
 Chondrus Cuvier, 1817
 Georginapaeus Schileyko, 1988
 Peristoma Krynicki, 1833
 Ramusculus Lindholm, 1925
 Thoanteus Lindholm, 1925
 tribus Enini
 Akramowskiella Schileyko, 1984
 Andronakia Lindholm, 1914
 Apoecus Möllendorff, 1902
 Ayna Páll-Gergely, 2009 
 Clausilioides Lindholm, 1925
 Differena Schileyko, 1984
 Ena Turton, 1831 - type genus of the family Enidae
 Geminula Lindholm, 1925
 Imparietula Lindholm, 1925
 Jaminia Risso, 1826
 Laevozebrinus Lindholm, 1925
 Ljudmilena Schileyko, 1984
 Mastoides Westerlund, 1896
 Megalena Hausdorf, 1999 There is only one species Megalena crassa (Retowski, 1887) in the genus Megalena.
 Mirus Albers, 1850
 Napaeus Albers, 1850
 Napaeopsis Sturany & Wagner, 1914
 Ottorosenia Muratov, 1992
 Pseudochondrula Hesse, 1933
 Pseudonapaeus Westerlund, 1887
 Retowskia O. Boettger, 1881
 Subzebrinus Westerlund, 1887
 Turanena Lindholm, 1922
 tribus Chondrulini
 Chondrula Beck, 1837 - type genus of the tribe Chondrulini
 Leucomastus Wagner, 1928
 Mastus Beck, 1837
 Meijeriella Bank, 1985
 Rhabdoena Kobelt & Möllendorff, 1902
 Zebrina Held, 1837
 tribus Multidentulini
 Chondrulopsina Lindholm, 1925
 Euchondrus Boettger, 1883
 Improvisa Schileyko, 1978
 Multidentula  Lindholm, 1925
 Merdigera Held, 1837
 Pentadentula Suvorov, 2006
 Senaridenta Schileyko, 1978
 Siraphoroides Schileyko, 1977

subfamily Buliminusinae
 Buliminus Beck, 1837 - type genus of the subfamily Buliminusinae
 Cyrenaeus Heller, 1971
 Mordania Bank & Neubert, 1998
 Paramastus Hesse, 1933
 Pene Pallary, 1929

subfamily ?
 † Balearena Altaba, 2007 - type species † Balearena gymnesica Altaba, 2007
 Luchuena Habe, 1956

References

External links
 

 
Gastropod families